BEDI RAM is an Indian politician. As of 2022 he is a member of 18th Legislative Assembly of Uttar Pradesh. He represents the Jakhania constituency in Ghazipur district of Uttar Pradesh and is a member of the Suheldev Bharatiya Samaj Party.

Political career
triveni Ram is a member of the 17th Legislative Assembly of Uttar Pradesh. Since 2017, he has represents the Jakhania constituency and is a member of the SBSP.

Posts held

See also
Uttar Pradesh Legislative Assembly

References

Uttar Pradesh MLAs 2017–2022
Suheldev Bhartiya Samaj Party politicians
Living people
Year of birth missing (living people)